Spirulida is an order of cephalopods comprising one extant species (Spirula spirula) and several extinct taxa.

Fossil record 

 Oldest representative: Carboniferous, though contested: see Shimanskya
 Oldest uncontested representative: Late Jurassic

Classification
Order Spirulida
?Family †Shimanskyidae
Suborder †Groenlandibelina Khromov, 1990
Family †Groenlandibelidae
Family †Adygeyidae
Suborder †Belopterina Engeser, 1998
Family †Belemnoseidae
Family †Belopteridae
Suborder Spirulina Pompeckj, 1912
Family †Spirulirostridae
Family †Spirulirostrinidae
Family Spirulidae

References

Tree of Life: Spirulida
The Taxonomicon: Order Spirulida
Mikko's Phylogeny Archive: Spirulida

Coleoidea
Cephalopod orders
Cenozoic cephalopods